MBC Newsdesk is the main nightly newscast of the Munhwa Broadcasting Corporation (MBC). It premiered on October 5, 1970, and currently airs at 19:50 KST. It is presented by Wang Jong-myung and Lee Jae-eun on weekdays, and Kim Kyung-ho and Kim Cho-rong on weekends. It recently celebrated its 50th anniversary, making it the longest-running newscast in South Korean television.

History
The newscast premiered on October 5, 1970, as MBC 뉴우스데스크 due to the orthography at the time. It was then renamed MBC News Scene (MBC 뉴스의 現場) on 1976 before reverting to its original title in 1980, this time as MBC 뉴스데스크.

Segments

Current segments

Main segments 

 News Pre-desk (뉴스프리데스크) is a YouTube-only segment established on June 29, 2020, following reorganization, where announcer Kim Min-ho and head of news strategy team Sung Ji-young brief viewers about different issues. Guests also drop by the show sometimes, including anchor Wang Jong-myung.
 Going Right Away (바로 간다) is a segment centered on investigative reporting. It is a merge of old segments Camera Dispatch, On-site Dispatch and On-site Dispatch M.
 MBC Tip-off (제보는 MBC) is a segment established on October 13, 2020, where viewers send in tips to the news department for developing stories. It was preceded by You Are the News.
 In-depth Coverage M (집중취재M) is a segment established on October 15, 2020, centered exclusively on investigative reporting.
 Site 36.5 (현장 36.5) is a segment where stories and/or interviews are aired with subtitles and background music.
 In Today's News (오늘 이 뉴스) explains stories briefly.
 Weighing Facts (팩트의 무게) is similar to JTBC Newsroom's Fact Check segment where reporter Nam Sang-ho fact-checks statements or give in-depth explanations on a certain topic.
 Omniscient Political View (정치적 참견시점) is a segment where anchor Wang Jong-myung and reporter Kim Jae-young analyze how journalists produce their stories, similar to Newsroom's Behind Plus segment, but specializing in political stories.. The title is a parody of the network's variety show Omniscient Interfering View.
 One-shot Politics (정치원샷) is a segment where the latest happenings on politics is summarized in one minute.
 Roadman (로드맨) is a Saturday-only segment where reporter Yeom Kyu-hyun goes out in the field to cover stories. He is backed up by reporter-turned-producer Kwak Seung-kyu, cameraman Kim Tae-hyo, writer Lee Mi-rim and assistant director Ryu Da-ye, with fellow reporter Nam Hyung-suk serving as the Fact Man to help viewers understand the issues being explained.
 My First Interview (내 생애 첫 인터뷰) is another weekend-only segment where anchor Kim Kyung-ho holds a camera with a selfie stick and interviews people working behind the scenes in the style of a vlog.
 MBC Sports News (MBC 스포츠뉴스) is the show's sports segment hosted by Lee Young-eun, where she details the latest in the sports world.
 MBC Weather (MBC 날씨) is the show's weather segment presented by Choi Ah-ri.

News Pre-desk segments 

 Walking Through the Cue Sheet (큐시트 산책) previews how the show will go through the cue sheet provided by Noh Jae-pil, head of the Newsdesk editing team. This typically is aired last, but can be omitted when Pre-invitation is extended.
 Pre-invitation (프리 초대석) is where the hosts talk about issues with an expert.
 Old-fashioned Politics (아재정치) is a Tuesday-only segment where Hwang Oe-jin drops by to talk about political issues.
 Economic Hand (손경제) is a Thursday-only corner where announcer Lee Sun-young talks about economic issues.
 Choi Ah-ri's Painful Weather (최아리의 날씨앓이) is a Friday-only segment where weathercaster Choi Ah-ri explains issues related to the weather.

Former segments 

 In Today's Newsdesk (오늘의 뉴스데스크) previews the top stories that will be covered in the show. It was abolished on March 18, 2019, following reorganization.
 Today's Stocks (오늘의 증권) is a segment where then-reporter Kwon Jae-hong delves on the latest at the stock exchange.
 Economic Trends (경제 동향) is a short segment where important economic factors are displayed, such as stocks and exchange rates. It was abolished on March 18, 2019.
 Camera Dispatch (카메라 출동) is a segment focused on investigative reporting, and was one of the show's most popular segments.
 Desk Video (데스크 영상) is a video montage appearing before presenting the weather. Songs from popular anime and games are used during this segment, such as an instrumental version of A Cruel Angel's Thesis, Tsuna Awakens from the Reborn! score and multiple themes from the MapleStory score.
 My Little Newsdesk (마이 리틀 뉴스데스크) borrows the format of variety show My Little Television where Lee Jae-eun (joined by reporter Lim Kyung-ah on Mondays, Wednesdays and Fridays; and Kim Kyung-ho on Tuesdays and Thursdays) presents different articles to viewers, who will react to it via livestream.
 Kim Soo-jin's Human Story (김수진의 스토리 人) is a short-lived segment where anchor Kim Soo-jin interviews people. Only two episodes were broadcast, one with Seoul mayor Park Won-soon and actor Ha Jung-woo.
 News Refresh (뉴스 새로고침) is a fact-checking segment hosted by Park Young-hoe, where he conducts interviews rather than putting separate reports. The title is derived from the Internet's refresh function.
 Back to the News (BACK 투 더 뉴스)
 You are the News (당신이 뉴스입니다) is a segment where viewers provide tips about stories around them. It is succeeded by MBC Tip-off.
 Minority Opinion (소수의견)

Anchors

Weekdays

Weekends

References

External links
 MBC News
 MBC News 

1970 South Korean television series debuts
South Korean television news shows
MBC TV original programming
Flagship evening news shows
Korean-language television shows